The rufous piha (Lipaugus unirufus) is a species of bird in the family Cotingidae.
It is found in Belize, Colombia, Costa Rica, Ecuador, Guatemala, Honduras, Mexico, Nicaragua, and Panama. Its natural habitat is subtropical or tropical moist lowland forests.

Description
The upper parts are a uniform reddish-cinnamon and the underparts are similar but a slightly paler shade, the throat being the palest part. The bill is broad and either flesh-coloured or brown at the base, and there is sometimes a slight ring round the eye. This bird could be confused with the speckled mourner (Laniocera rufescens) but that bird is shorter and more slender, with a slimmer bill and a relatively longer tail; the male rufous piha utters various piercing, whistling calls.

Ecology

The rufous piha breeds between March and August in Costa Rica, there probably being two clutches in the year. The diet consists largely of fruits, such as those of laurels and palms, and invertebrates such as insects and spiders. It lives in the middle and lower storeys of humid forest and seldom descends to ground level. Much of its food is plucked while it hovers, and anything gathered on the ground is carried aloft before being eaten. It often sits lethargically on a suitable perch for long periods, sallying out at intervals to snap up passing insect prey.

Status
The rufous piha has a very wide distribution and its total population is estimated to be within the range 50,000 to 500,000 individuals. The population may be in slight decline because of deforestation, particularly in Colombia and Ecuador, but not at a fast enough rate for it to be considered threatened, so the International Union for Conservation of Nature has rated it as being a "least-concern species".

References

Further reading

rufous piha
Birds of Central America
Birds of Colombia
rufous piha
rufous piha
Taxonomy articles created by Polbot